The Issoire APM 30 Lion is a French three-seat light aircraft manufactured by Issoire Aviation of Issoire. Designed as a trainer, the aircraft is type certified under CS-VLA and is supplied complete and ready-to-fly.

Design and development
The aircraft features a cantilever low-wing, a three-seat enclosed cockpit under a bubble canopy, fixed tricycle landing gear with wheel pants and a single engine in tractor configuration.

The aircraft is made from composite materials. The standard engine is the  Rotax 912S four-stroke powerplant.

Specifications

References

Low-wing aircraft
2000s French civil utility aircraft
Single-engined tractor aircraft
Aircraft first flown in 2005
APM30